Machinations may refer to:

Machinations (band), a 1980s Australian new wave pop band
Machinations: An Anthology of Ingenious Designs, a 2002 Australian collection of short stories